Beach Soccer Stars is an annual award ceremony in beach soccer organised by the sport's developmental body, Beach Soccer Worldwide (BSWW).

The first edition was held on 7 November 2014 in Dubai, United Arab Emirates. The ceremony has continued to take place in the Emirate every year since, occurring after the conclusion of the Beach Soccer Intercontinental Cup during the first week of November and has been called beach soccer's version of the better known Ballon D'or in association football.

A gala event, attended by many of the world's top current and former players, coaches, officials and other beach soccer figures, five individual prizes are awarded for the best beach soccer player of the year, best goalkeeper of the year, best coach, rising star and best goal. Further awards are presented to the five players that, combined, are deemed to produce a dream team for that season as well as a prize for best event of the year. In 2017, BSWW introduced a sixth individual award for best women's player of the year and in 2019, an award to recognise a legendary figure of the sport.

Various parties decide the award winners, including coaches, players, BSWW expert panel and fans. In 2016, coaches and captains from a total of 75 national beach soccer teams voted on the awards, rising to 115 teams in 2021.

The most recent edition, the eighth, took place on 4 November 2022.

Winners
There was no ceremony held in 2020 due to the COVID-19 pandemic.

Best player
Decided by: Players and coaches

Fellow national team captains and coaches vote for who they want to be crowned best player of the year. BSWW reveal a shortlist of the three players with the most votes prior to the ceremony. On the awards night, the winner of the award with the most votes of the three is revealed as the best player of the year.

Best goalkeeper
Decided by: Players and coaches

Fellow national team captains and coaches vote for who they want to be crowned best goalkeeper of the year. BSWW reveal a shortlist of the three players with the most votes prior to the ceremony. On the awards night, the winner of the award with the most votes of the three is revealed as the best goalkeeper of the year.

Best coach
Decided by: Players and coaches

Fellow national team captains and coaches vote for who they want to be crowned best coach of the year. BSWW reveal a shortlist of the three coaches with the most votes prior to the ceremony. On the awards night, the winner of the award with the most votes of the three is revealed as the best coach of the year.

Rising star award
Decided by: BSWW panel of experts

Experts at BSWW decide which player will be crowned the best rising star of the year. On the awards night, the winner of the award is revealed. No preliminary shortlist is disclosed.

Best Five
Decided by: Players and coaches

Fellow national team captains and coaches vote for the five players that they believe, combined, form the best team of the year, similar to the FIFA World XI award in association football. On the awards night, the five winners of the award with the most votes are revealed as the Best Five.

Best goal
Decided by: Fans

BSWW allow fans to vote for which goal will be named best of the year through their website. Fans have a shortlist of ten goals to choose from, nominated by BSWW. On the awards night, the winner of the award is revealed.

Best event
Decided by: BSWW panel of experts

Experts at BSWW decide which competition will receive the prize for best event of the year. On the awards night, the winner of the award is revealed. No preliminary shortlist is disclosed.

Best women's player
Decided by: Players and coaches

New award introduced in 2017.

Fellow national team captains and coaches vote for who they want to be crowned best women's player of the year. BSWW reveal a shortlist of the three players with the most votes prior to the ceremony. On the awards night, the winner of the award with the most votes of the three is revealed as the best women's player of the year.

Best legend
Decided by: BSWW panel of experts

New award introduced in 2019.

Experts at BSWW decide which figure will be awarded the legend award for that year. On the awards night, the winner of the award is revealed. No preliminary shortlist is disclosed.

See also
The Best FIFA Football Awards

Notes

References

External links
 Beach Soccer Worldwide, official website
Beach Soccer Stars editions:

2014
2015
2016

2017
2018
2019

2021
2022

Awards established in 2014
Beach soccer
Sports trophies and awards
Events in Dubai
2014 establishments in the United Arab Emirates